The Central Service Station at 534 Whitman St. in Rosalia, Washington was built in 1923.  It was listed on the National Register of Historic Places in 2007.

It is a  brick commercial building, with brick laid in common bond, on a poured concrete foundation.  It was deemed notable as an "intact example of an early Texaco gas station in eastern Washington. The building embodies the distinctive characteristics of its type (House with a Canopy), and period of construction."

References

Gas stations on the National Register of Historic Places in Washington (state)
National Register of Historic Places in Whitman County, Washington
Early Commercial architecture in the United States
Buildings and structures completed in 1923